Christer Allgårdh (born 20 February 1967) is a former professional tennis player from Sweden.

Career
Allgårdh won the doubles event at the 1982 Junior Orange Bowl, with Bruno Orešar of Yugoslavia. Back home in Sweden he was a national junior champion in 1979, 1981 and 1985.

On the ATP Tour, Allgårdh was most prominent as a doubles player and won a tournament in his first ever Grand Prix appearance, at Bari in 1987. He won his second title in 1992, teaming up with Carl Limberger in the Guarujá Open. The Swede was also a finalist in two other events, but was unable to add any more titles.

As a singles player he had his best result in the 1988 Athens Open, where he reached the semi-finals.

He took part in the main draw of two Grand Slams during his career, both in 1993 and in doubles. At the French Open that year, Allgårdh played beside Sander Groen and they lost in the opening round. Although he also failed to get past the first round in the 1993 Wimbledon Championships, this time partnering Maurice Ruah, the pair were able to push third seeds Patrick McEnroe and Jonathan Stark to five sets, eventually losing 8–10 in the decider.

Grand Prix/ATP career finals

Doubles: 4 (2–2)

Challenger titles

Singles: (1)

Doubles: (7)

References

1967 births
Living people
Swedish male tennis players
People from Borås
Sportspeople from Västra Götaland County
20th-century Swedish people